Praealticus caesius is a species of combtooth blenny found in the western central Pacific ocean.  This species grows to a length of  SL.

References

caesius
Taxa named by Alvin Seale
Fish described in 1906